The Armenia men's national under-18 basketball team is a national basketball team of Armenia, administered by the Basketball Federation of Armenia. It represents the country in international men's under-18 basketball competitions.

FIBA U18 European Championship participations

See also
Armenia men's national basketball team
Armenia men's national under-16 basketball team
Armenia women's national under-18 basketball team

References

External links
Archived records of Armenia team participations

Armenia national basketball team
Basketball
Men's national under-18 basketball teams